The Junior League World Series West Region is one of six United States regions that currently sends teams to the World Series in Taylor, Michigan. The region's participation in the JLWS dates back to 1981. It has produced the most JLWS championships (11) by any region.

West Region States

Region Champions
As of the 2022 Junior League World Series.

Results by State
As of the 2022 Junior League World Series.

See also
West Region in other Little League divisions
Little League – West 1957-2000
Little League – Northwest
Little League – West
Intermediate League
Senior League
Big League

References

West
Baseball competitions in the United States